Club Sportif de Makthar (often referred to as ٍُCSMak ) is a Tunisian football club from Makthar founded in 1942.

Football clubs in Tunisia
Association football clubs established in 1942
Multi-sport clubs in Tunisia
1942 establishments in Tunisia
Sports clubs in Tunisia